Samuel Pratt (died 14 November 1723) was a Canon of Windsor from 1697 - 1723 and Dean of Rochester from 1706 - 1723.

Career
He was educated at Merchant Taylors' School and St Catharine's College, Cambridge and graduated D.D. (per lit. reg.) in 1697.

He was appointed:
Head Master of Wye Grammar School, Kent
Chaplain to the Princess of Denmark
Rector of Kenardington, Kent 1682 - 1693
Vicar of Islington, 1690
Vicar of All Hallows' Church, Tottenham 1693 - 1707
Curate of St Mary le Strand 1697 (the congregation then used the Savoy Chapel)
Chief domestic Chaplain to Queen Anne
Sub-preceptor to Prince William, Duke of Gloucester
Dean of Rochester 1706 - 1723
Clerk of the Closet 1706 - 1714
Vicar of Goudhurst, Kent 1700 - 1713
Vicar of Twickenham 1712 - 1723

He was appointed to the fourth stall in St George's Chapel, Windsor Castle in 1697, and held the stall until 1723.

Notes 

Year of birth missing
1723 deaths
People educated at Merchant Taylors' School, Northwood
Alumni of St Catharine's College, Cambridge
Canons of Windsor
Deans of Rochester
Clerks of the Closet
Academics of Wye College